Toledo State Airport  is a public airport located one mile (1.6 km) southwest of Toledo in Lincoln County, Oregon, United States.

External links

Airports in Lincoln County, Oregon